General Curtis may refer to:

Alfred Cyril Curtis (1894–1971), British Indian Army major general
Arthur R. Curtis (1842–1925), Union Army brevet brigadier general (post-war honorary grade)
Edward Peck Curtis (1897–1987), U.S. Army Air Corps major general
Greely S. Curtis (1830–1897), Union Army brevet brigadier general
Henry Curtis (British Army officer) (1888–1964), British Army major general
Merritt B. Curtis (1892–1966), U.S. Marine Corps brigadier general
Newton Martin Curtis (1835–1910), Union Army brigadier general and brevet major general
Reginald Salmond Curtis (1863–1922), British Army major general
Samuel Ryan Curtis (1805–1866), Union Army major general